Jerome Anderson (October 9, 1953 – August 1, 2009) was an American professional basketball player and coach. He was born in Mullens, West Virginia.

A 6'5" (1.96 m) guard from West Virginia University, Anderson was selected in the third round of the 1975 NBA Draft by the Boston Celtics and in the seventh round of the 1975 ABA draft by the San Diego Sails.

Anderson played two seasons (1975–1977) in the National Basketball Association as a member of the Boston Celtics and Indiana Pacers. He averaged 2.6 points per game in his career and won an NBA championship with Boston in 1976.

Anderson later played and coached in Sweden and Norway. Among his achievements as a coach is a BLNO Championship with the Ulriken Eagles in 2007.

Anderson died in Helsingborg aged 55 after a long illness.

References

External links
 
Jay Anderson 
WVU Stats

1953 births
2009 deaths
African-American basketball players
Basketball coaches from West Virginia
American expatriate basketball people in Norway
American expatriate basketball people in Sweden
American men's basketball players
Basketball players from West Virginia
Boston Celtics draft picks
Boston Celtics players
Indiana Pacers players
People from Mullens, West Virginia
San Diego Sails draft picks
Shooting guards
West Virginia Mountaineers men's basketball players
20th-century African-American sportspeople
21st-century African-American people